The Vargas tragedy was a natural disaster that occurred in Vargas State, Venezuela on 14–16 December 1999, when torrential rains caused flash floods and debris flows that killed tens of thousands of people, destroyed thousands of homes, and led to the complete collapse of the state's infrastructure. According to relief workers, the neighborhood of Los Corales was buried under  of mud and a high percentage of homes were simply swept into the ocean. Entire towns including Cerro Grande and Carmen de Uria completely disappeared. As much as 10% of the population of Vargas died during the event.

Background

The coastal area of Vargas State has long been subject to mudslides and flooding. Deposits preserved on the alluvial fan deltas here show that geologically similar catastrophes have occurred with regularity since prehistoric times. Since the 17th century, at least two large-magnitude debris flow, landslide, or flood events, on average, have occurred each century within the modern boundaries of Vargas. Recorded events occurred in February 1798, August 1912, January 1914, November 1938, May 1944, November 1944, August 1948, and February 1951. In the February 1798 event, flash floods and debris flows severely damaged 219 homes. Spanish soldiers barricaded an upstream-facing entrance to a fort with cannons in order to prevent debris from filling it.

Prior to the 1999 disaster, the most recent major flood had occurred in 1951, but that event did not cause as much damage. Based on aerial photos and records of measurements, geologists were able to directly compare the 1951 event to the 1999 event. The 1951 event involved less rainfall than the 1999 event, fewer landslides were triggered, and less fresh debris was observed on the fans. The unusually strong storm in December 1999 dumped  of rain over just a few days, triggering widespread soil instability and flow of debris. Adding to the devastation, Vargas State had experienced high population growth and development since the 1951 disaster, thus increasing the toll of casualties.

Population density

The alluvial fans built as sediments from floods and debris flows exit their channels and meet the oceans provide the only extensive flat surfaces along the mountainous coastline of north-central Venezuela. As such, many of them have been extensively developed and urbanized. This high population density increases the risk to life and property from flash flood and debris flow events.

As of 1999, several hundred thousand people lived in this narrow coastal strip in Vargas State. Many of these people lived atop alluvial fans formed by debris flows sourced out of the  peaks to their south.

Rainfall

December 1999 was unusually wet along the north-central Venezuelan coast. The first, and less powerful, storm that month occurred 2–3 December and dropped  of rain on the coast.

Two weeks later, in a 52-hour span during 14, 15 and 16 December 1999,  of rain (approximately one year's average total rainfall for the region) was measured on the north-central coast of Venezuela at Simón Bolívar International Airport in Maiquetia, Venezuela. These heavy rains included  of accumulation in just one hour, between 6 and 7 AM on the 16th; precipitation on both the 15th and 16th exceeded the 1,000-year probability rainfall event. Even so, the coast received much less rain than some regions upstream.

This sudden and intense storm was especially unusual because it occurred in December, while the typical rainy season in coastal Venezuela lasts from May to October. These out-of-season rains formed when a cold front interacted with a moist southwesterly flow in the Pacific Ocean. This interaction produced moderate to heavy rainfall starting in the first week of December and culminating in the 14–16 December event that caused the deadly floods and debris flows.

The heaviest rains were centered around the mid-upper part of the San Julián basin, which feeds water and sediment onto the Caraballeda fan. Heavy rains persisted within  of the coast, and subsided on the Caracas side of the Cerro El Ávila. Rainfall rates also decreased westward toward Maiquetía.

Geology

Bedrock

The bedrock in the region surrounding Caracas is mainly metamorphic. Soils forming on them are fine-grained (clayey), thin, and often colluvial. Further inland, gneisses of the Paleozoic San Julián Formation and Precambrian Peña de Mora Formation extend to the crest of the Sierra de Avila. These units have thin soils over less-weathered bedrock; this is believed to be because of rapid erosion due to the steep slopes in this area.

Because foliation planes are planes of weakness, these fabrics within the rocks strongly influence landslide and debris flow hazards. Where the foliation planes are dipping towards a free surface, failure is likely to occur along these planes.

Alluvial fan sedimentology and past floods

The alluvial fans that spread out into the sea from valley mouths were built by previous flood and debris flow events. The modern channel systems of these alluvial fan deltas are incised into previously deposited debris flow and flood material. Scientists at the US Geological Survey measured these old deposits. They found that they are thicker than the December 1999 ones and contain larger boulders. This means that previous debris flows were even larger than those in December 1999 and reached higher velocities.

On the Caraballeda fan, the extent of the 1951 event paled in comparison to the 1999 event. Much of the deposits that constitute the Caraballeda fan are of a thickness similar to those produced in the 1999 event and contain boulders of a size similar to those observed in 1999.

The bottom paleosol was radiocarbon dated to 4267 ±38 years Before Present (BP), and the top one was dated to 3720±50 years BP. The scientists were not able to tell whether the deposits were from a single debris flow or multiple events.

Surficial geology and geomorphology

Alluvial fan deltas in this region have shallow slopes. They are poorly channelized because sediment is being added to them from upstream (infilling the channels) at a rate equal to or greater than the rate at which it can be removed.

Hillslopes are steepened past the angle of repose for noncohesive materials. This oversteepening is more than could be provided for by the frictional resistance of the sandy soils. Internal soil cohesion, negative pore pressure ("soil suction"), soil structure, and/or tree root reinforcement may be responsible for this.

Neotectonics

These abandoned high surfaces suggest recent and continuing tectonic uplift of the Venezuelan coast and corresponding river channel incision. In spite of the fact that most onshore faults active in this region during the Quaternary are mapped as right-lateral strike-slip, it is possible that there is a vertical component of offset in offshore faults.

Event

Heavy rains fell in December 1999 along the north-central coast of Venezuela, culminating in a period of extreme intensity from 14 to 16 December. Starting around 8 PM local time (AST) on 15 December, runoff entered channels and rushed towards the sea, picking up and depositing sediments on its way. Generally after this first wave of flooding, from the coast to just past the crest of the Sierra de Avila, these rains triggered thousands of shallow landslides that stripped soil and rock off of the landscape and sent them slipping down the mountainside. Additional water liquefied these landslides into debris flows, which are granular flows in which water mixes with high concentrations of rock and mud. The first eyewitness accounts of debris flows were from 8:30 PM on the 15th, and the final debris flows were reported between 8 and 9 AM on 16 December. Many catchments released multiple debris flows, some of which carried large boulders and tree trunks onto the alluvial fan deltas. Starting between 7 and 9 AM on the 16th and continuing until late that afternoon, a new wave of floods occurred. These floodwaters were less concentrated in sediment and were therefore able to entrain new material and incise new channels into the flood and debris flow deposits from the previous days.

The debris flows moved rapidly, and many of them were highly destructive. These rapid, bouldery flows resulted in much of the observed destruction.

In addition to these debris flows, flash floods carrying extremely high sediment loads were very dangerous. Together the flash floods and debris flows destroyed hundreds of houses, bridges, and other structures. They incised new channels to depths of several meters into every alluvial fan delta on the Vargas state coastline, and they blanketed these fans with sediment.

Caraballeda fan

Of the many communities that were affected by the disaster, the Caraballeda fan was one of the most hard-hit. The intensity of the disaster here is a combination of two factors. First, the Caraballeda fan was heavily urbanized, with many high-rise buildings and multistory houses. Second, it lies at the mouth of the Quebrada San Julián (Saint Julian Ravine), and this watershed produced very large boulders and a massive inundated area. Approximately 1/3 of the Caraballeda fan was inundated by debris flows, and the entire fan is built of past debris flow deposits.

The floods and debris flows of 1999 did not follow the eastern channel on Caraballeda. This channel, formed during the 1951 floods, had been lined with concrete and designed to safely transport the flows into the sea. Instead, the debris flows overwhelmed the channel and the flows overtopped the banks wherever the channel changed direction. Once free of the culvert, the channel rapidly avulsed across the fan and spread debris throughout the community. These overbank flows demolished 2-story houses and destroyed the first two stories of apartment buildings. Farther down the fan, the debris flows routed themselves down streets. As the flows progressed, they left thinner and thinner deposits, though they often still exceeded 1 meter (3 feet) in thickness. After several avulsions, the channel roughly followed the pre-1951 flood path.

USGS geologists estimate the deposit volume to be at least 1.8 million cubic meters (from comparing topographic scans) or 1.9 million cubic meters (from field measurements). This is among the largest rainfall-induced debris flow deposits in recorded history, though volcanic-induced debris flows can be ten times as large. Subaqueous deposition extended the shoreline an additional 40–60 meters into the sea. The deposit thicknesses range from 4–5 meters (maximum of 5.3 meters) near the center of the fan to around 0.5 meters near the pre-flood shoreline. Maximum boulder sizes decreased towards the shoreline due to the decreasing slope of the fan.

Damage

The disaster caused estimated damages of US $0.07 to $3.5 billion dollars. The death toll was considered to be between 10,000 and 30,000—the exact number of casualties is difficult to determine as there is no reliable census data from the region at that time, especially about shanty towns and small communities that were completely wiped out. Moreover, only some 1,000 bodies were recovered, with the rest swept to sea by the mud or buried in the landslides. More than 8,000 homes and 700 apartment buildings were destroyed in Vargas, displacing up to 75,000 people. Over 70% of the total population of Vargas State was affected by the disaster. Public services, like water, electricity, phone lines, and land transportation (roads and bridges) completely disappeared in some places. There were no supplies of food and water for months, so most of the population had to be evacuated. Looting and sacking occurred everywhere, forcing the military to implement martial law for more than a year.

Response

The disaster was of such magnitude that the president of the Red Cross initially presumed more than 50,000 dead. The first priority was to evacuate survivors; more than 100,000 people were ultimately evacuated. After the disaster, Venezuelan President Hugo Chávez advocated for other Venezuelans to open up their homes, and "adopt a family". The former First Lady of Venezuela arranged the temporary sheltering of children that were feared orphaned in La Casona, the Presidential residence in Caracas. Others offered help, including Major League Baseball shortstop Omar Vizquel, a native Venezuelan, who helped raise over $500,000 in relief funds. After the initial emergency response, focus shifted to analyzing the causes of the disaster, and working to create a sustainable infrastructure for dealing with future torrential rains. A disaster relief team from the United States headed up by New Mexico state Senator Joseph Carraro arrived with a medical team and supplies to assess the damage and help those who were displaced. Contact was made with Los Alamos Laboratory in New Mexico to determine any radioactive activity included in the debris field. Water purification and sleeping units were provided.

The disaster clean-up soon became politicized. Chávez initially accepted assistance from anyone who offered, with the United States sending helicopters and dozens of soldiers that arrived two days after the disaster. When defense minister Raúl Salazar accepted the United States offer of further aid that included 450 Marines and naval engineers aboard the USS Tortuga, which was setting sail to Venezuela, Chávez told Salazar to decline the offer since "[i]t was a matter of sovereignty". Salazar became angry and assumed that Chávez's opinion was influenced by talks with Fidel Castro; though he complied with Chávez's order.

Despite initial dispersals of emergency funds, receiving tens of millions of dollars from international organizations and the announcement of reconstruction plans, little came of the process and Chávez grew distracted with political squabbles, abandoning attention on the tragedy with recovery ultimately halting. Survivors eventually left their refugee areas and returned to their homes in an attempt to rebuild. By 2006, the state was back to its pre-disaster population level, and projects were slowly being carried out to rebuild damaged infrastructure. Over a decade after the tragedy, thousands remained homeless and the value of real estate in zones untouched by the floods declined by as much as 70%, due to the destruction of infrastructure.

Orion, a Rottweiller, was officially recognized for his role in rescuing people during the tragedy. A mudslide forced Orion and his owner Mauricio Pérez to leave their home and go to a safer place. They came across a young girl trapped by turbulent water. Orion guided the girl to shore by swimming at her side, then jumped back in to pull a second girl out of the water. He then helped eight children climb to high places. He spent Wednesday night and part of Thursday morning saving 37 people from drowning, ranging from a girl of 8 years old to an elderly man of 80 years old. He was awarded the Medal "Honor The Value" and a certificate for the role he played. He also received plaques and medals from private institutions and governments, international tributes and recognition by the Grand Lodge of Masonry in Venezuela. On 1 December 2008, Orion died of intestinal gastroenteritis.

Three films were made about the tragedy by Venezuelan filmmakers, all released in 2011; this is said to show the lasting impact of the tragedy that people were still sharing these narratives, especially in a nation with a poor cinema industry.

See also

Armero tragedy – a similarly catastrophic debris flow event caused by a volcanic eruption in Colombia in 1985

References

Bibliography
Geologic sources

 Antonio Luis Cárdenas Colménter. Análisis del Fenómeno Ocurrido en el Litoral Venezolano en diciembre de 1999.

External links

Wikimedia commons: Vargas in January 2000
Wikimedia commons: Vargas in December 2000

Landslides in Venezuela
Floods in Venezuela
Mudslide
1999 floods in South America
1999 in Venezuela 
1999 disasters in Venezuela 
Vargas tragedy
December 1999 events in South America